Dubrovka is a rural locality (a village) in Unechsky District, Bryansk Oblast, Russia. The population was 3 as of 2010. There are 3 streets.

Geography 
Dubrovka is located 56 km northeast of Unecha (the district's administrative centre) by road. Degtyanovo is the nearest rural locality.

References 

Rural localities in Unechsky District